Vonnegut is a German-rooted surname.

Notable people with the surname Vonnegut include:

Kurt Vonnegut (1922–2007), American science fiction writer
Clemens Vonnegut (1824–1906), German-American businessman, great-grandfather of Kurt Vonnegut
Bernard Vonnegut I (1855–1908), American lecturer and architect, son of Clemens Vonnegut, Sr. and grandfather of Kurt
Kurt Vonnegut, Sr. (1884–1957), American architect and lecturer, son of Bernard I and father of Kurt
Bernard Vonnegut (1914–1997), American atmospheric scientist, elder brother of Kurt
Edith Vonnegut (born 1949), American painter, daughter of Kurt
Mark Vonnegut (born 1947), American memoirist and journalist, son of Kurt
Norb Vonnegut (born 1958), American thriller author, fourth cousin of Kurt